Shailendra Kumar (born 25 July 1960) is an Indian politician belonging to the Jansatta Dal (Loktantrik). He was three times member of Lok Sabha from the Kaushambi constituency (2009-2014) &  Chail constituency(1998–99) & (2004–2009) in Uttar Pradesh from the Samajwadi Party. He has been a Member of the Legislative Assembly (MLA) twice.

Furthermore, he is the son of former Union Minister of India and senior Indian National Congress leader late Dharamveer and elder brother of ex-MLA for Soraon, Satyaveer Munna.

References

Living people
1960 births
Samajwadi Party politicians
India MPs 1998–1999
India MPs 2004–2009
India MPs 2009–2014
People from Kaushambi district
Politicians from Allahabad
Lok Sabha members from Uttar Pradesh
Jansatta Dal (Loktantrik) politicians
Samajwadi Party politicians from Uttar Pradesh